Alicia Elizabeth Victoria (born 25 March 2002) is an American-born Dominican footballer who plays as a defender for the Troy Trojans and as a right and center back for the Dominican Republic women's national team.

International career
Alicia Victoria has appeared for the Dominican Republic at the 2020 CONCACAF Women's Olympic Qualifying Championship qualification.

References

External links

2002 births
Living people
Citizens of the Dominican Republic through descent
Dominican Republic women's footballers
Women's association football forwards
Women's association football fullbacks
Dominican Republic women's international footballers
Soccer players from Florida
American women's soccer players
American sportspeople of Dominican Republic descent
21st-century American women
Sportspeople from Coral Springs, Florida
Troy Trojans athletes
College women's soccer players in the United States